Murfreesboro is a city and the county seat of Rutherford County in the U.S. state of Tennessee.

Murfreesboro may also refer to:
Murfreesboro, Arkansas, city in Pike County, Arkansas
Murfreesboro, North Carolina, city in Hertford County, North Carolina

Military
One of three battles in the American Civil War
First Battle of Murfreesboro (July 13, 1862)
The Second Battle of Murfreesboro or the Battle of Stones River (December 31, 1862, to January 2, 1863)
Third Battle of Murfreesboro (December 5–7, 1864)